The Welsh records in athletics are ratified by Welsh Athletics, Wales' governing body for the sport of athletics. A Welsh National Record can be set by any athlete with Welsh Qualification in worldwide competition.

Key to tables
Key:

h = hand timing

Outdoor

Men

Women

Indoor

Men

Women

Mixed

Notes

References
General
Welsh Outdoor Records – Men 31 October 2021 updated
Welsh Outdoor Records – Women 31 October 2021 updated
Welsh Road, Long Distance Track and Walking Records 27 April 2018 updated
Welsh Ultra Distance Records 9 September 2012 updated
Welsh Walking Records – Men 30 June 2021 updated
Welsh Walking Records – Women 30 June 2021 updated
Welsh Indoor Records – Men 30 April 2020 updated
Welsh Indoor Records – Women 30 April 2020 updated
Specific

External links
Welsh Athletics

Welsh
Records
Athletics records